Lee Yang-xuan (born 27 October 1995 in Hong Kong), is a Hong Kong footballer who plays for Hong Kong First Division League club Southern District RSA as a goalkeeper.

Club career

Early career
Studying at The Chinese Foundation Secondary School, Lee was a member of Kitchee reserves in the 2011–12 season. He joined Southern youth team in the 2012–13 season.

Southern
Due to the departure of first choice goalkeeper Diego Jose Gomez Heredia, Southern head coach Fung Hoi Man invited him to train with first team. He spent whole season on the bench, except the final match of the season against Kitchee of the Hong Kong Season Play-offs semi-finals on 19 May 2013. He started in the match due to the injury of first choice Chiu Yu Ming. He conceded two goals and the team lost 0–2 to end the season.

In the 2013–14 season, his squad number has changed from 1 to 37.

Career statistics
 As of 23 June 2013

References

Living people
1995 births
Hong Kong footballers
Association football goalkeepers
Hong Kong First Division League players
Southern District FC players